Timothy C. Wentworth (born 1959/60) is an American businessman. He is the former CEO of Evernorth, Cigna's health services platform and the former CEO of Express Scripts, the United States' largest pharmacy benefit manager.

Education
Wentworth graduated from Monroe Community College with an associate degree in business. During his time at Monroe, he received a scholarship from Eastman Kodak Co. Wentworth later earned a bachelor's degree in Industrial and Labor Relations from Cornell University's Industrial and Labor Relations School. He later received an honorary doctorate degree from the State University of New York.

Career
Wentworth began his career in the music industry, spending three years at RCA Records. He then held human resources management positions at PepsiCo. before joineing Mary Kay, Inc. During his five years at Mary Kay, he was senior vice president of human resources and then president, international. In 1998, Wentworth joined Merck - Medco as senior vice president, account management. He was subsequently promoted to executive vice president account service and strategy as part of Medco's 2003 spin-off from Merck. Wentworth was CEO and president of Accredo, Medco's specialty pharmacy.

In April 2012, Express Scripts Holding Company acquired Medco for $29.1 billion. As part of the merger, Wentworth, then senior vice president of sales and account management, joined Express Scripts. He was head of sales and account management operation and senior vice president before he was named president of the company in January 2014. In September 2015, Wentworth was named CEO of Express Scripts. Previous CEO George Paz became the company's chairman.

In 2015, Express Scripts was ranked number 66 on Forbes magazine's list of the World's Most Innovative Companies. By 2017, Express Scripts was the 22nd-largest company in the United States by total revenue as well as the largest pharmacy benefit management (PBM) organization in the US.

In March 2018, it was announced that Cigna, a global health services company, would acquire Express scripts for $67 billion.  After the merger of Express Scripts with Cigna in December 2018, Wentworth became the president of both companies.

In September 2020, Cigna launched Evernorth, its health services portfolio, with Wentworth as CEO.  In September 2021, Wentworth announced that he would retire from Cigna the following December.

Philanthropy
The Wentworths established a scholarship fund at Monroe Community College (MCC) for business and music majors and gave the school a Steinway piano in 2009.

In 2010, they established the Wentworth Family Endowed Scholarship at the University of Rochester, the school two of their three children attended, which supports students transferring from community or junior colleges. In 2012, after a $1 million donation to the school, the Wentworth Atrium in the Raymond F. LeChase hall of the University of Rochester's Warner School of Education was named for the Wentworths. The couple are members of the George Eastman Circle, the University of Rochester's giving society, as well as the University's Parents Council. They also serve as co-chairs of the Parents Initiative for the Meliora Challenge. In May 2013, Wentworth was named to the University of Rochester Board of Trustees.

In November 2013, the Wentworths gave MCC $2.25 million which would be processed through the Monroe Community College Foundation and award full scholarships to 40 MCC students annually. This was the largest single donation in MCC's history at the time. They also donated $3 million to the University of Rochester's Institute of Data Science in 2015.

In 2018, Monroe Community College announced a $50 million scholarship fund, which was led off with a $4 million donation from the Wentworth family.  In 2019, the Wentworths committed $2.5 million to endow a professorship and a scholarship at the University of Rochester’s Eastman School of Music.  The Robin and Tim Wentworth Professorship in Piano will support and recognize a dedicated faculty member, while the Wentworth Family Scholarship will benefit deserving students.

In 2021, Tim and Robin Wentworth were announced as co-chairs of the Eastman School of Music’s centennial fundraising campaign, which seeks to raise a total of $100 million to ensure the school’s second century of excellence.

In March of 2022, Cornell University’s ILR School announced that Mr. Wentworth and his wife Robin had made a $1 million gift that will be used to establish the ILR Workplace Inclusion and Diversity Education program. The program, known as ILR WIDE, will be directed by Vice Provost for Undergraduate Education Lisa Nishii, an ILR professor who is one of the nation’s foremost scholars on organizational inclusion. ILR WIDE will seek to help promote workplace inclusion and study approaches that foster a culture of inclusive leadership through empathy and dialogue-based interventions.

References

Year of birth missing (living people)
Living people
Cornell University alumni
American chief executives